Kubik or Kubík may refer to:

 11598 Kubík, a main-belt asteroid
 Kubik (comics), a Marvel Comics character
 Kubik, a fictional planet created by British band Coldplay as part of the concept of their 2021 album Music of the Spheres

People 
 Arkadiusz Kubik (born 1972), Polish footballer
 František Kubík (born 1989), Slovak footballer
 Gail Kubik (1914–1984), American composer
 Gerhard Kubik (born 1934), Austrian music ethnologist
 Karl Kubik, Austrian footballer in the early 20th-century
 Ladislav Kubík (1946–2017), Czech-American composer
 Luboš Kubík (born 1964), Czech footballer and manager
 Łukasz Kubik (born 1978), Polish footballer
 Nicole Kubik (born 1978), basketball player
 Renata Kubik (born 1983), Serbian sprint canoer
 Tomáš Kubík (footballer, born 1992), Slovak football player
 Tomáš Kubík (footballer, born 2002), Slovak football player
 Tomáš Kubík (painter) (born 1977), Czech painter
 Vladimir Kubik, a Brazilian manager of the Companhia Viação São Paulo-Mato Grosso

See also 
 KUBIK, part of the payload for SpaceX CRS-7
 KUBIK, a loudspeaker manufactured by Danish Audiophile Loudspeaker Industries